The Carbon Medal is a medal of achievement in carbon science and technology given by the American Carbon Society for the "... outstanding contributions to the discovery of novel carbon products or processes."

Awardees
The following have won the Carbon Medal:

 1997 Robert Curl (Rice University, co-discoverer of fullerene)
 1997 Harry Kroto (University of Sussex, co-discoverer of fullerene)
 1997 Richard Smalley (Rice University, co-discoverer of fullerene)
 2001 Mildred Dresselhaus (MIT, researcher of carbon nanotubes)
 2004 Donald S. Bethune (IBM research, researcher of single-walled carbon nanotubes)
 2004 Morinobu Endo (Shinshu University, one of the pioneers of carbon nanofibers and carbon nanotubes synthesis)
 2004 Sumio Iijima (NEC, often cited as the inventor of carbon nanotubes)
 2016 Andre Geim (University of Manchester, co-inventor of graphene)
 2016 Konstantin Novoselov (University of Manchester, co-inventor of graphene)

References

1997 establishments in the United States
Awards established in 1997
American science and technology awards
Carbon